Henry Shukman (born 1962 in Oxford, Oxfordshire) is an English poet and writer. He was  educated at the Dragon School, Oxford. His father was the historian Harold Shukman and his brother is the BBC News reporter David Shukman. He is of Jewish ancestry – his grandfather, David Shukman, was part of the Jewish community who lived in Baranow, Congress Poland which was then part of the Russian Empire, before emigrating and settling in the United Kingdom.

In 2000 he won the Daily Telegraph Arvon Prize, and in 2003 his first poetry collection, In Dr No's Garden, published by Cape, won the Jerwood Aldeburgh Poetry Prize. His book was also the Book of the Year in The Times and The Guardian, and he was selected as a Next Generation Poet in 2004.

His poems have appeared in The New Republic, The Guardian, The Times, Daily Telegraph, Independent on Sunday, Times Literary Supplement and London Review of Books. In 2013, he wrote a poetry collection Archangel about Jewish tailors sent to Russia to fight in the First World War.

As a fiction writer he won the Author's Club First Novel Award in 2006 for his short novel Sandstorm (Jonathan Cape), and as well as winning an Arts Council England Writer’s Award, he has been a finalist for the O. Henry Award. His second novel was called The Lost City. It was a Guardian Book of the Year, and in America, where it was published by Knopf, it was a National Geographic Book of the Month.

He has worked as a travel writer, was Poet in Residence at the Wordsworth Trust. He teaches at the Mountain Cloud Zen Center and is a Zen Teacher in the Sanbo Kyodan lineage, with the teaching name Ryu'un.

One Blade of Grass: Finding the Old Road of the Heart, a Zen Memoir was published in October 2019.

See also
David Shukman

References

External links
 Publisher's website

1962 births
21st-century English novelists
Living people
English emigrants to the United States
English people of Russian-Jewish descent
English Jews
Jewish poets
English male poets
English male novelists
21st-century English male writers
Shukman family